Richard Nduhura, sometimes spelled Richard Nduhuura, is a Ugandan politician, diplomat and veterinarian who  currently serves as Uganda's Permanent Representative to the United Nations. He was appointed to that position in August 2012. Prior to that, he served as State Minister for Health (General Duties) in the Ugandan Cabinet. He was appointed to that position on 1 June 2006. In the cabinet reshuffle of 16 February 2009, and that of 27 May 2011, he retained his cabinet post.

Background and education
He was born in Bushenyi District, on 17 February 1956. Richard Nduhura holds the degree of Bachelor of Veterinary Medicine (BVM), from Makerere University, Uganda's oldest university.

Work experience
His work history has been varied and dates back to 1979 when he started practice as a Veterinary Officer and continued to practice until 1989. In 1988, he was elected General Secretary of Bushenyi District Local Council (LC-V), serving in that capacity until 1989. Between 1998 and 2001, he served as the Chairperson of the Bushenyi District Service Commission. In 2001, he entered active politics, contesting the parliamentary seat of Igara County East, Bushenyi District. He won that seat and was re-elected in 2006. However, in 2011 he lost during the primary elections to the incumbent MP, Michael Muranga Mawanda, also of the National Resistance Movement (NRM) political party.

In 2001, he was appointed State Minister for Industry, serving in that capacity until 2003. He was then appointed State Minister for Trade, where he served until 2005. He then served briefly as State Minister for Local Government between 2005 and 2006. He was appointed State Minister of Health for General Duties, serving in that capacity from 2006 until he was appointed UN Ambassador in August 2012.

See also
 Parliament of Uganda
 Cabinet of Uganda
 Bushenyi District

References

External links
 Website of the Parliament of Uganda
 Full Uganda Cabinet List on 1 June 2006
  Full of List of Ugandan Cabinet Ministers May 2011

1956 births
Living people
People from Bushenyi District
People educated at Ntare School
Government ministers of Uganda
National Resistance Movement politicians
Makerere University alumni
Ugandan veterinarians
Ugandan diplomats
People from Western Region, Uganda
Members of the Parliament of Uganda